Lincoln is a town in Grafton County, New Hampshire, United States. It is the second-largest town by area in New Hampshire. The population was 1,631 at the 2020 census. The town is home to the New Hampshire Highland Games and to a portion of Franconia Notch State Park. Set in the White Mountains, large portions of the town are within the White Mountain National Forest. The Appalachian Trail crosses the western and northeastern parts of the town. Lincoln is the location of Loon Mountain Ski Resort and associated recreation-centered development.

The primary settlement in town, where 969 people resided at the 2020 census, is defined as the Lincoln census-designated place (CDP) and is located along New Hampshire Route 112 east of Interstate 93. The town also includes the former village sites of Stillwater and Zealand (sometimes known as Pullman) in the town's remote eastern and northern sections respectively, which are now within the White Mountain National Forest.

History

In 1764, colonial Governor Benning Wentworth granted  to a group of approximately 70 land investors from Connecticut. Lincoln was named after Henry Fiennes Pelham-Clinton, 2nd Duke of Newcastle, 9th Earl of Lincoln – a cousin of the Wentworth governors. He held the position of comptroller of customs for the port of London under King George II and George III, which was important to trade between America and England.

The town was settled about 1782. The 1790 census indicates that it had 22 inhabitants. Rocky soil yielded poor farming, but the area's abundant timber, combined with water power to run sawmills on the Pemigewasset River and its East Branch, helped Lincoln develop into a center for logging. By 1853, the Merrimack River Lumber Company was operating. The railroad transported freight, and increasingly brought tourists to the beautiful mountain region. In 1902, he built a pulp and paper mill. He erected the Lincoln House hotel in 1903, although a 1907 fire would nearly raze the community. Until he died in 1912, Henry controlled his company town, installing relatives in positions of civic authority.

In 1917, Henry's heirs sold the business to the Parker Young Company, which in turn sold it to the Marcalus Manufacturing Company in 1946. Franconia Paper took over in 1950, producing 150 tons of paper a day until bankruptcy in 1971, at which time new river classification standards discouraged further papermaking in Lincoln.

Tourism is today the principal business. Nearby Loon Mountain has long drawn skiers, and in recent years has attempted to convert itself into a four-season attraction. The Flume is one of the most visited attractions in the state. Discovered in 1808, it is a natural canyon extending  at the base of Mount Liberty.

Geography
It is the second-largest town in area in New Hampshire, after Pittsburg.

Lincoln is drained by the Pemigewasset River and its East Branch. Lincoln lies almost fully within the Merrimack River watershed, with the western edge of town in the Connecticut River watershed. Kancamagus Pass, elevation , is on the Kancamagus Highway at the eastern boundary.

Demographics

As of the census of 2010, there were 1,662 people, 794 households, and 439 families residing in the town. There were 2,988 housing units, of which 2,194, or 73.4%, were vacant. 2,083 of the vacant units were for seasonal or recreational use. The racial makeup of the town was 96.9% white, 0.3% African American, 0.1% Native American, 1.7% Asian, 0.0% Native Hawaiian or Pacific Islander, 0.3% some other race, and 0.6% from two or more races. 1.7% of the population were Hispanic or Latino of any race.

Of the 794 households, 21.5% had children under the age of 18 living with them, 43.1% were headed by married couples living together, 7.8% had a female householder with no husband present, and 44.7% were non-families. Of all households, 37.0% were made up of individuals, and 13.4% were someone living alone who was 65 years of age or older. The average household size was 2.09, and the average family size was 2.75.

In the town, 18.7% of the population were under the age of 18, 6.8% were from 18 to 24, 19.4% from 25 to 44, 34.8% from 45 to 64, and 20.4% were 65 years of age or older. The median age was 48.5 years. For every 100 females, there were 105.2 males. For every 100 females age 18 and over, there were 103.3 males.

For the period 2011–2015, the estimated median annual income for a household was $37,095, and the median income for a family was $55,326. Male full-time workers had a median income of $31,106 versus $27,381 for females. The per capita income for the town was $24,109. 21.0% of the population and 9.1% of families were below the poverty line. 20.2% of the population under the age of 18 and 8.6% of those 65 or older were living in poverty.

Sites of interest
 Clark's Bears (formerly Clark's Trading Post)
 White Mountain Central Railroad
 Franconia Notch State Park, including:
 Flume Gorge
 Lonesome Lake
 Hobo Railroad
 Loon Mountain ski resort
 Whale's Tale Water Park

See also
 White Mountain art

References

External links

 
 Lincoln Public Library
 New Hampshire Highland Games
 New Hampshire Economic and Labor Market Information Bureau Profile

 
1764 establishments in New Hampshire
Company towns in New Hampshire
Logging communities in the United States
Populated places established in 1764
Towns in Grafton County, New Hampshire
Towns in New Hampshire